Christine Harijaona Razanamahasoa is a Malagasy politician. She served as a Minister of Justice between 2009 and 2013, and as the president of the Malagasy National Assembly from February till May 2014, becoming the first woman in this position. She was elected again on 16 July 2019.

Christine Razanamahasoa is a lawyer by education.

On 17 March 2009, as a result of 2009 Malagasy political crisis, president Marc Ravalomanana was removed from his position, and the High Transitional Authority, led by Andry Rajoelina, was formed. The High transition authority elected Rajoelina the president of Madagascar, and Albert Camille Vital became the Prime Minister and formed the government. Christine Razanamahasoa became the Minister of Justice in that government. On 28 October 2011, Rajoelina dismissed the government and asked Omer Beriziky to form the new one. Razanamahasoa joined the new government, and on 31 October 2013 resigned and was replaced by Florent Rakotoarisoa. The reason for her resignation was that she intended to participate in forthcoming national elections.

In 2013, she was elected to the National Assembly from Ambatofinandrahana District representing the MAPAR party, founded by the former president Andry Rajoelina. On 5 May 2014, the parliament elected the new president, and dismissed Razanamahasoa. The High Constitutional Court later confirmed that the voting was legal. She remained the deputy and the national coordinator of MAPAR.

References

Presidents of the National Assembly (Madagascar)
Living people
21st-century Malagasy women politicians
21st-century Malagasy politicians
Women legislative speakers
Women government ministers of Madagascar
Year of birth missing (living people)
Malagasy lawyers